Gonggar Xoi, locally just Xoi, is a village in , , Gonggar County, Tibet Autonomous Region, China. It was the capital of Gonggar County and the seat of Gonggar Dzong from 17th century to 1960. Gonggar Xoi means below the Gonggar (dzong).

See also
List of towns and villages in Tibet

References

Populated places in Shannan, Tibet